The Belgium–Luxembourg Economic Union, abbreviated to BLEU or UEBL, is an economic union between Belgium and Luxembourg, two countries in the Benelux Union.

BLEU was created by a treaty, signed on 25 July 1921, despite a referendum against such a proposal, between Belgium and Luxembourg, and came into effect upon ratification by the Luxembourg Chamber of Deputies on 22 December 1922. Under the terms of the treaty, the economic frontier was lifted and the Belgian franc and Luxembourg franc were set at a fixed parity (though revised in 1935 and 1944) establishing a fixed exchange rate system, which existed until the introduction of the euro. The original treaty lasted for fifty years, expiring in 1972; this was extended for ten years in 1982 and again in 1992. On 18 December 2002, the two countries and the three regions of Belgium signed a new convention.

It has been seen as the forerunner of the Benelux Union, which was established as the Benelux Customs Union in 1944 by the London Customs Convention and also includes the Netherlands. While many aims of the BLEU have been subsumed by the Benelux Union, and later the European Union, it still has some relevance in being able to decide more precise measures than these organisations. International trade statistics were available for BLEU only as a combined entity until 1999 when European Community rules required split information.

History 
Compared with the Zollverein, the UEBL had several advantages for Luxembourg. Belgium was only allowed to alter its customs tariffs or conclude trade treaties after consultation with the Luxembourgish government, whereas before 1918 Luxembourg had to go along with German decisions. Similarly, only Luxembourgish customs agents would operate in Luxembourg, while under the Zollverein Prussian officials had operated in Luxembourg. 

The functioning of the UEBL was entrusted to a Board of Directors consisting of two Belgian members (including the chairman) and one Luxembourgish member, and the Higher Council of the Union (with three Belgian and two Luxembourgish members).

See also
 Belgium–Luxembourg relations
 European Coal and Steel Community
 Luxembourg referendum, 1919

Footnotes

References

External links
 Official site

Benelux
Currency unions
Economy of Luxembourg
Economy of Belgium
1922 establishments in Belgium
Belgium–Luxembourg relations
1922 establishments in Luxembourg
Treaties entered into force in 1922
Treaties of Belgium
Treaties of Luxembourg
Treaties concluded in 2002
Customs treaties
Treaties concluded in 1921
European integration